Harry Saxon was a rancher and politician from Arizona.  He served several terms as the sheriff of Santa Cruz County, Arizona, was mayor of Willcox, and was a representative in the Arizona State Legislature during the 1st Arizona State Legislature.  In 1890 his widowed mother moved to Calabasas.  In 1903 he became a "line rider", a mounted customs inspector.  In 1906 he was elected sheriff of Santa Cruz County.

During World War I, he served in the United States Cavalry.  In 1926, he became a partner in the Three Links Cattle Co., and managed its operations until 1941, when it was sold.

References

Arizona Democrats
Members of the Arizona House of Representatives
Arizona pioneers